Christopher Charles Wood (born 15 May 1955) is an English former professional footballer, who played for Huddersfield Town, Barnsley and Doncaster Rovers as a goalkeeper.

References

1955 births
Living people
English footballers
People from Penistone
Association football goalkeepers
English Football League players
Huddersfield Town A.F.C. players
Barnsley F.C. players
Doncaster Rovers F.C. players